Hazem Adnan Jawdat Abu Hussein commonly known as Hazem Jawdat (born 5 March 1984) is a retired Jordanian footballer of Palestinian descent.

Style of play
He is known for scoring goals and shooting from very far distances and his excellent job of being a left winger for his team. He is also a free kick specialist and is known for his speed, making many accurate crosses and passes from far distances.

Club career
Hazem began his professional career in 2002 with Shabab Al-Ordon. He scored nine goals in his nine-seasons long spell at the Amman based club.

After his promising performance with Shabab Al-Ordon, he moved to Saudi Arabia where he signed a contract with Saudi Professional League club, Hajer Club. He made thirty five league appearances for the club his two-seasons spell at the club scoring one goal in the 2012–13 season.

In 2013, he came back to Jordan and signed a contract with  Al-Wehdat SC.

In the same season, he moved to Oman where he signed a contract with newly promoted side (To Oman Professional League), Sohar SC. He was the captain of his team throughout the 2013–14 season.

Club career statistics

References

External links

Profile Info at Goalzz.com

1984 births
Living people
Jordanian footballers
Jordan international footballers
Jordanian people of Palestinian descent
Association football midfielders
Shabab Al-Ordon Club players
Al-Wehdat SC players
Hajer FC players
Jordanian expatriate footballers
Expatriate footballers in Saudi Arabia
Sohar SC players
Expatriate footballers in Oman
Jordanian expatriate sportspeople in Oman
Jordanian expatriate sportspeople in Saudi Arabia
That Ras Club players
Al-Ahli SC (Amman) players
Saudi Professional League players
Jordanian Pro League players
Oman Professional League players